Moodswings is a musical duo composed of Grant Showbiz and James F. T. Hood.

History 
Grant Showbiz was a onetime roadie and guitar tech who later produced albums by The Smiths, Billy Bragg, Silverfish, and Gong. James Hood was a former drummer for The Pretenders, The Impossible Dreamers, Kid Creole & the Coconuts, and Jeff Beck. After Showbiz and Hood teamed up in 1989, the duo released the album Moodfood (Arista/BMG, 1992), which scored a hit with a remade single of "Spiritual High (State of Independence) Pt. II," which featured vocals by Chrissie Hynde; (the original song is called "State Of Independence" written by Jon Anderson and Vangelis from the Jon and Vangelis album called The Friends of Mr Cairo). "Spiritual High Pt. III," from the same album, featured samples from Martin Luther King Jr.'s "I Have a Dream" speech.

The Live at Leeds EP (Arista) followed in 1994 (with artwork styled after the album by the Who of the same name), and in 1997, the group released Psychedelicatessen (Arista/BMG), which featured vocals from Tanita Tikaram, on the song "Oh Happy Day". Grant Showbiz was a member of Moodswings up until the album Horizontal, which James Hood solo-produced (Varèse Sarabande, 2002). Julee Cruise sings vocals on two tracks from Horizontal: "Seems to Remind Me" and "Into the Blue." James Hood contributed "Storm in a Teacup" from the same album for the 2005 documentary Do You Believe? Another World is Possible.

Impact 
"Spiritual High II" was played during the closing credits of the 1992 Bridget Fonda film, Single White Female.

"The Great Sound of Letting Go" was featured in the Chris Morris radio series Blue Jam and its TV counterpart Jam.

Discography
 Moodfood (1992)
 Live at Leeds (1994)
 Psychedelicatessen (1997)
 Horizontal (2002)

DVDs
 Open Space — Volume 1 (2006)
 Pretenders Greatest Hits (2006)
 The Velvet Lounge (2002)

See also 
List of ambient music artists

References

External links

Ambient music groups
Musical groups established in 1992
British trance music groups
Varèse Sarabande Records artists
Arista Records artists